Tjuvholmen is a peninsula penetrating Mjøsa in Hamar, Norway. It is largely a recreational area and features a marina.

References

Hamar